Verkhniye Sergi is an urban locality (a work settlement) in Nizhneserginsky District of Sverdlovsk Oblast, Russia, located in the Ural Mountains on the Serga River  west-southwest of Yekaterinburg and  east of Nizhniye Sergi. Population:

References

Urban-type settlements in Sverdlovsk Oblast
Krasnoufimsky Uyezd